Warszawa Ursus Północny railway station is a railway station in the Ursus district of Warsaw, Poland. The station is served by Koleje Mazowieckie, who run trains from Kutno to Warszawa Wschodnia.

References

External links 
 
Station article at kolej.one.pl

Ursus Polnocny
Railway stations served by Koleje Mazowieckie
Ursus, Warsaw